Most newspapers are privately owned but are subsidized and regulated by the government in Saudi Arabia. The "Basic Law" of the kingdom states that the mass media's role is to educate and inspire national unity; consequently, most popular grievances go unreported in Saudi Arabia. For instance, the invasion of Kuwait by Iraq in 1990 was not immediately reported in the Saudi Arabian mass media. As of 2013, BBC News reports that criticism of the government and the royal family and the questioning of Islamic tenets "are not generally tolerated. Self-censorship is pervasive." As of 2014, Freedom House rates the kingdom's press and internet "Not Free".

Overview
As of 2006, the government has allowed some critical stories to be written by selected journalists. Although self-censorship continues to be a method of self-preservation for the nation's media outlets, government censorship seems to be decreasing, especially on journalistic inquiries into crime and terrorism. Newspapers are created by royal decree. There are more than a dozen dailies. Pan-Arab newspapers from other countries are available but subject to censorship. The government (BSKSA) operates almost all domestic broadcasting outlets in Saudi Arabia. Censors remove objectionable material deemed offensive by the standards of Islam, including references to pork, Christianity and other religions, alcohol and sex. Private TV stations cannot operate from Saudi soil. Although government officials monitor Internet sites for material deemed pornographic, politically offensive, or anti-Islamic, Saudi Internet users can gain access to most sites by simply connecting through an alternative server. The government created an appeals process circa 2006 by which citizens can request that particular websites be unblocked. As of 2014 there were 17.4 million internet users.

Article 39 of the "Basic Law" of the kingdom states:
Mass media and all other vehicles of expression shall employ civil and polite language, contribute towards the education of the nation and strengthen unity. It is prohibited to commit acts leading to disorder and division, affecting the security of the state and its public relations, or undermining human dignity and rights.

Pan-Arab broadcasting
Saudi media has influence outside of the borders of the kingdom, as the country is "a major market for pan-Arab satellite and pay-TV".  Saudi investors are behind the major networks Middle East Broadcasting Center (MBC), which is based in Dubai, and Bahrain-based Orbit Showtime. 
Middle East Broadcasting Center (MBC) was launched in London, shortly after the 1991 Gulf War. In 1993 the entertainment, music and sport network Arab Radio and Television Network was founded by Saudi mogul Saleh Abdullah Kamel. From 1994 until 1996 when it was pulled off the air, BBC Arabic Television channel was run by Rome-based Orbit Communications Company, a subsidiary of the Saudi Arabian Mawarid Holding. It was launched again in March 2008 as part of BBC World Service. 
Saudi Prince Al-Waleed bin Talal owns the Rotana Group media entertainment conglomerate and in late 2011 acquired a $300 million stake in the social media site Twitter.

According to As'ad AbuKhalil, (author and political science professor at California State University, Stanislaus), “It is now a taboo in Arab culture to criticize Saudi. Even [Lebanon's] Hezbullah media is careful, and in Qatar media criticism has been going down, it has been very sensitive." One reason for this caution is that journalists who run critical stories "jeopardize their future careers, particularly if they aspire to work for the higher paying Gulf and Saudi networks." According to AbuKhalil, “As a journalist today you cannot criticize Saudi – where would you work?” Another is that  "40-70% of the region's advertising" comes from Saudi Arabian companies, organizations, etc. "Networks, TV channels and publications are not going to risk jeopardizing their cash flow by upsetting their prime advertising market in the region's largest economy," according to Arab Media & Society.

Social media
According to the estimation of the Word Bank in 2017, near about 50% of the population of the world uses the mobile phone. Out of 4.77 billion people that have been taken into consideration, 2.32 billion users use the smartphone. The people are getting connected with the society and for the business user. With the increase in the usage of the smartphone, the usage of the internet also gets increased. According to the recent survey, almost 95% population of Saudi Arabia uses the smartphone, and 85% of the population are subscribed to the mobile broadband people. Saudi Arabia is one of the most active countries that use the social network. Many Saudi Arabians have been getting involved with multiple social media platforms, and about almost half the population use Twitter. Along with Twitter they also have a large wave of people other applications such as Path, Keek, and Instagram which are the most popular social media sites used in Saudi Arabia.

Social media has morphed from a networking platform to a potent force for social change in Saudi Arabia. The government uses the social media platform to connect with the citizens all over the state. The social media applications help them to gauge public consciousness. The important government members of Saudi Arabia are taken to their respective Facebook account as well as Twitter accounts to drive for reforms across Saudi Arabia state. Members of the Saudi Arabia ruling government such as Tawfiq Al-Rabiah, Minister of Commerce and Industry and Abdulaziz Khoja, Minister of Culture and Information utilize their own social media websites or platform to spread information related to government initiatives and policies.

The younger generation of Saudi Arabia uses the Internet more in comparison to the older people. They use the internet mainly for the entertainment purposes and chatting purposes. Another survey has been conducted, and it verifies that most of the internet users are men. However, the women of Saudi Arabia desire to have rights like the modern women everywhere. The women want to use the internet and the social media.  Hala Al-Dosari, an activist utilizes the power of social media to work to induce King Salman to stop the male guardianship practice. Near about 15,000 signatures have been accumulated after a Twitter campaign with hashtag the #IAmMyOwnGuardian.

The numbers of social media users have risen significantly in recent years. Saudi Arabia is considered as the largest markets for the social network located in the Middle East. Facebook and WhatsApp are the popular social networking sites used in Saudi Arabia. 97% of the users who live in Saudi Arabia use Facebook as 81% of them use WhatsApp. The Facebook and the WhatsApp provide the platform through which the users can express their ideas and thoughts, and people of Saudi Arabia use these platforms to communicate and stay interlinked with each other. The Saudi Arabians with the help of these platforms get more freedom of speech. Facebook has about 12 million users all over the world, and 2 million out of those 12 million users are from Saudi Arabia. At the moment there are about 70% YouTube users, and they watch 90 million videos on a daily basis. In Saudi Arabia, twitter is the most visited website, their users tweet 5 times per day on an average.

There is another point that must be taken into consideration. In 2016, Saudi Arabia was one of the fastest-growing Twitter markets in the world. Studies from Omnicom Media Group (OMG) confirm that Saudi Arabia currently has the highest Twitter penetration in the entire world. OMG also states that every three out of seven people search for the social network before anything else. Saudi Arabians also use the social media for other means; individuals use it as a platform for job searching, they also use the platform as a source selling products and promoting brands.  King Abdulaziz University conducts research and explains all the adverse effects of using social media. The users are becoming overly dependent on the social network. The users are getting isolated from the normal social communication. Only 29% of the users prefer to visit their relatives because of the social network. The people of Saudi Arabia tend to share knowledge, videos, pictures and news on the social media channels. The users spend too much of their time on their electronics and they share relative information and personal information with the relatives, family and the closed ones.

Television channels
Al Ekhbariya (News)

Al Arabiya (News)

ALHADTH (News)

KSA SPORTS

MBC 1 (TV shows &news$ talk shows)Middle East

MBC 2 (Hollywood movies)

MBC 3 (Kids)

MBC 4 (Hollywood TV shows)

Rotana Cinema

Rotana Khalejiah (Talk shows $ Arab TV shows)

Rotana Music

MBC Drama (Middle East)

MBC Max (Hollywood movies)

MBC+ Drama

Saudi T.V. Channel 1

QURAN TV

SUUNA TV

Wanasah (Music)

Faaliat (Main events)

MBC Bollywood

Arabic daily newspapers 

Al-Bilad
 Al Eqtisadiah
Al Jazirah
Al Madina
Al Nadwa
Al Riyadh
Al Watan
Al Yaum
Okaz

English daily newspapers
Al-Hayat
Arab News
Asharq Al-Awsat
Saudi Gazette

Malayalam daily newspapers
Madhyamam
Jeddah edition - January 16, 2006
Riyadh edition - December 10, 2007
Dammam edition - May 24, 2008
Abha edition - January 1, 2011
Gulf Thejas
Riyadh edition - March 2011
Dammam edition - March 2011
Jeddah edition - March 2011

Freedom of speech

Saudi Arabia does not tolerate dissidents and impose penalties on such people. It is responsible for executing Saudi-American journalist, Jamal Khashoggi, in 2018. As he entered a Saudi embassy in Istanbul, Turkey, a group of Saudi assassins murdered him.

See also

 List of companies of Saudi Arabia
 Lists of television channels
 Television in Saudi Arabia

References

 
Saudi Arabia
Saudi Arabia